is the ninth single by Bump of Chicken. The title track is from the album . The second B-side is a remix of "Snow Smile", also from Yggdrasil.

Track listing
All tracks written by Fujiwara Motoo.

 (Hidden track)

Personnel
Fujiwara Motoo — Guitar, vocals
Masukawa Hiroaki — Guitar
Naoi Yoshifumi — Bass
Masu Hideo — Drums

Chart performance

References

External links
車輪の唄 on the official Bump of Chicken website.

2004 singles
Bump of Chicken songs
2004 songs
Toy's Factory singles